Ceresin (also cerin, cerasin, cerosin, ceresin wax or ceresine) is a wax derived from ozokerite by a purifying process.

The purifying process of the ozokerite commonly comprises a treatment with heat and sulfuric acid, but other processes are also in use.

Uses include:

 An alternative to beeswax in ointments
 (Historic) laboratory-supply bottles for small amounts of hydrofluoric acid, which were made of ceresin wax; this was before polyethylene became commonplace.

External links
 AKROCHEM® CERESIN WAX, Akrochem product information

Waxes